The Canal de la Basse Colme is a canal in northern France from Bergues to Hondschoote on the Belgian border.  It is the eastern segment of the Canal de la Colme.  In Belgium, it continues as the Canal de Bergues (in Dutch : Bergenvaart).

Today, this channel is downgraded.

History
In the castellany of Furnes, the name given to the channel was Bergenvaart or Kolme (Canal de Bergues Canal Colme). During the Middle Ages, the canal was a very important trade route. In 1622, it was improved and a lock was built by the Spaniards in time of war Houthem to prevent flooding from Bergues. The French side of the canal has been deepened and it looks like much more of an industrial canal. The Belgian side has kept its medieval character.

See also
List of canals in France

References

Canals in France
Buildings and structures in Nord (French department)